Qeshlaq-e Khanlu (also Romanized as Qeshlāq-e Khānlū; also known as Khānlū) is a village in Abish Ahmad Rural District, Abish Ahmad District, Kaleybar County, East Azerbaijan Province, Iran. At the 2006 census, its population was 130, in 30 families.

References 

Populated places in Kaleybar County